Thomas Reed Cobb (July 2, 1828 – June 23, 1892) was an American lawyer and politician who served five terms as a U.S. Representative from Indiana from 1877 to 1887.

Biography 
Born in Springville, Lawrence County, Indiana, Cobb attended Indiana University Bloomington.
He studied law. He was admitted to the bar in 1851 and commenced practice in Bedford, Indiana.
He was commissioned as major of the Indiana Militia in 1852.
He moved to Vincennes, Indiana, in 1867.
He served as member of the State senate from 1858 until 1866 and as president of the Democratic State convention in 1876. He served as delegate to the Democratic National Convention in 1876.

Congress 
Cobb was elected as a Democrat to the Forty-fifth and to the four succeeding Congresses (March 4, 1877 – March 3, 1887).
He served as chairman of the Committee on Mileage (Forty-fifth and Forty-sixth Congresses), Committee on Public Lands (Forty-eighth and Forty-ninth Congresses).
He was not a candidate for renomination in 1886.

Later career and death 
He resumed the practice of law and also engaged in agricultural pursuits.
He died in Vincennes, Indiana, June 23, 1892.
He was interred in Old Vincennes Cemetery.

References

External links

1828 births
1892 deaths
People from Lawrence County, Indiana
19th-century American lawyers
Indiana University Bloomington alumni
People from Vincennes, Indiana
Democratic Party members of the United States House of Representatives from Indiana
19th-century American politicians